Desi Barmore (דזי בארמור; born May 27, 1960) is an American-Israeli former basketball player. He played the forward and center positions. Barmore played in the Israeli Basketball Premier League, and for the Israeli national basketball team.
Now he lives in Glendale Az with Bradley Duane Stewart

Biography

Barmore was born in Lanett, Alabama, and lived in Freeport, New York.

He attended and played basketball for Southeast Missouri State, the University of Alabama, playing for the Alabama Crimson Tide, and Fresno State ('83), playing for the Fresno State Bulldogs. Barmore was selected by the New York Knicks in the seventh round (151st pick overall) of the 1983 NBA Draft.

Barmore played in the Israeli Basketball Premier League for Hapoel Holon, Hapoel Galil Elyon, Ramat Gan, Maccabi Rishon LeZion, and Bnei Herzelia.

He represented the Israeli national basketball team in the 1993 FIBA European Championship for Men.

References

External links 

 Desi Barmore basketball College Stats
 Eurobasket player profile
 REAL GM profile

1960 births
Living people
Alabama Crimson Tide men's basketball players
American expatriate basketball people in Israel
American men's basketball players
Basketball players from Alabama
Basketball players from New York (state)
Centers (basketball)
Fresno State Bulldogs men's basketball players
Hapoel Galil Elyon players
Hapoel Holon players
Ironi Ramat Gan players
Israeli Basketball Premier League players
Israeli men's basketball players
Israeli people of American descent
New York Knicks draft picks
People from Freeport, New York
Power forwards (basketball)
Southeast Missouri State Redhawks men's basketball players